The following is an overview of 1935 in film, including significant events, a list of films released and notable births and deaths. The cinema releases of 1935 were highly representative of the early Golden Age period of Hollywood. This period was punctuated by performances from Clark Gable, Shirley Temple, Fred Astaire and Ginger Rogers, and the first teaming of Jeanette MacDonald and Nelson Eddy. A significant number of productions also originated in the UK film industry.

Top-grossing films (U.S.)

The top ten 1935 released films by box office gross in North America are as follows:

Events
 February 22 – The Little Colonel premieres starring Shirley Temple, Lionel Barrymore and Bill Robinson, featuring famous stair dance with Hollywood's first interracial dance couple
 February 23 – Gene Autry stars as himself as the Singing Cowboy in the serial The Phantom Empire.  He would later be voted the number one Western star from 1937 to 1942.
 February 27 – Seven-year-old Shirley Temple wins the first special Academy Juvenile Award.
 March – The Bantu Educational Kinema Experiment is started in order to educate the Bantu peoples.
 May – Formation of Republic Pictures following merger of smaller companies including Monogram Pictures, Mascot Pictures, Liberty Pictures and Majestic Pictures.
 May 31 – Fox Film and Twentieth Century Pictures merge to form 20th Century Fox.
 August 15 – Will Rogers who the previous year was voted the Top Money Making Star dies in a plane crash.
 August 25 – William Boyd appears in his first of 66 films as Hopalong Cassidy in Hop-Along Cassidy.
 September – Judy Garland signs a contract with Metro-Goldwyn-Mayer (MGM).
 September 5 – Gene Autry appears in his first film for the newly formed Republic Pictures – Tumbling Tumbleweeds, named after his second million-selling record.
 November 30 – The British-made film Scrooge, the first all-talking film version of Charles Dickens' novel A Christmas Carol, opens in the U.S. after its U.K. release on November 26. Seymour Hicks plays Ebenezer Scrooge, a role he has played onstage hundreds of times. The film is criticized by some for not showing all of the ghosts physically, and quickly fades into obscurity. Widespread interest does not surface until the film is shown on television in the 1980s, in very shabby-looking prints. It is eventually restored on DVD.

Academy Awards

The 8th Academy Awards were held on March 5, 1936, at the Biltmore Hotel in Los Angeles, California.  They were hosted by Frank Capra. This was the first year in which the gold statuettes were called "Oscars".

Most nominations: Mutiny on the Bounty (MGM) – 8

Major Awards

 Best Picture: Mutiny on the Bounty – Metro-Goldwyn-Mayer
 Best Director: John Ford – The Informer
 Best Actor: Victor McLaglen – The Informer
 Best Actress: Bette Davis – Dangerous

Most Awards: The Informer (RKO) – 4 (Actor, Director, Adaptation, Scoring)

Top Ten Money Making Stars
Exhibitors selected the following as the Top Ten Money Making Stars of the Year in Quigley Publishing Company's annual poll.

1935 film releases
United States unless stated.

January–March
January 1935
11 January
The Lives of a Bengal Lancer
The Night Is Young
18 January
David Copperfield
23 January
Bordertown
25 January
The Gilded Lily
27 January
The Youth of Maxim (USSR)
31 January
The Good Fairy
The Triumph of Sherlock Holmes
February 1935
1 February
Home on the Range
2 February
New Women (China)
4 February
The Mystery of Edwin Drood
8 February
Long Live with Dearly Departed (Czechoslovakia)
11 February
Police Chief Antek (Poland)
19 February
Ruggles of Red Gap
22 February
After Office Hours
Death Drives Through
The Little Colonel
Toni (France)
The Whole Town's Talking
March 1935
8 March
Naughty Marietta
Roberta
The Wedding Night
16 March
Gold Diggers of 1935
22 March
Life Begins at 40
Mississippi
25 March
The New Gulliver (U.S.S.R.)
28 March
Triumph of the Will (Germany)
30 March
Devdas

April–June
April 1935
10 April
Villa for Sale 
11 April
Four Hours to Kill!
18 April
G Men
19 April
Private Worlds
Reckless
Star of Midnight
20 April
Go Into Your Dance
Little Mother (Austria/Hungary)
Les Misérables
22 April
Bride of Frankenstein
25 April
Goin' to Town
27 April
Party Wire
30 April
The Scoundrel
May 1935
9 May
The Informer
11 May
Dinky
13 May
Werewolf of London
16 May
Drake of England (GB)
18 May
Black Fury
26 May
The Girl from 10th Avenue
31 May
Public Hero No. 1
June 1935
6 June
The 39 Steps (GB)
7 June
Doubting Thomas 
Our Little Girl
13 June
Becky Sharp
15 June
The Glass Key
The Million Ryo Pot (Japan)
28 June
The Arizonian

July–September
July 1935
6 July
Escapade
8 July
The Raven
12 July
Mad Love
The Murder Man
She
15 July
The Black Room
The Clairvoyant (GB)
18 July
Amphitryon (Germany)
19 July
Shanghai
20 July
Front Page Woman
26 July
Curly Top
31 July
Dante's Inferno
August 1935
2 August
The Farmer Takes a Wife
3 August
Man on the Flying Trapeze
9 August
The Call of the Wild
China Seas
15 August
Alice Adams
19 August
Westward Ho
25 August
Hop-Along Cassidy
29 August
Top Hat
30 August
Anna Karenina
September 1935
5 September
Tumbling Tumbleweeds
6 September
Steamboat Round the Bend
7 September
Little Big Shot
Page Miss Glory
8 September
The Dark Angel
9 September
Harmony Lane
14 September
Special Agent
19 September
She Married Her Boss
20 September
Broadway Melody of 1936
24 September
The Crime of Dr. Crespi
25 September
La Bandera (France)

October–December
October 1935
4 October
I Live My Life
5 October
Waterfront Lady
8 October
She Couldn't Take It
13 October
Barbary Coast
16 October
Way Down East
18 October
Hands Across the Table
The Last Days of Pompeii
24 October
Rendezvous 
25 October
The Crusades
Thanks a Million
27 October
Trans-atlantic Tunnel (GB)
28 October
No Limit (GB)
30 October
A Midsummer Night's Dream
31 October
Peter Ibbetson
November 1935
2 November
Princess Tam Tam (France)
4 November
Remember Last Night?
8 November
Mutiny on the Bounty
14 November
The Man Who Broke the Bank at Monte Carlo
15 November
Annie Oakley
A Night at the Opera
21 November
An Inn in Tokyo (Japan)
22 November
Crime and Punishment
The Littlest Rebel
Splendor
26 November
Scrooge (GB)
28 November
In Old Kentucky
30 November
Frisco Kid
December 1935
3 December
Carnival in Flanders (France)
6 December
Ah, Wilderness!
9 December
The Great Impersonation
17 December
The Ghost Goes West (GB)
20 December
Lucrezia Borgia
25 December
The Bride Comes Home
Dangerous
27 December
Professional Soldier
A Tale of Two Cities
28 December
Captain Blood
30 December
Magnificent Obsession
31 December
Let's Go With Pancho Villa (Mexico)

Notable films released in 1935
See also: United States unless stated.

0–9
The 39 Steps, directed by Alfred Hitchcock and starring Robert Donat and Madeleine Carroll (GB)

A
After Office Hours, starring Clark Gable and Constance Bennett
Ah, Wilderness!, starring Wallace Beery and Lionel Barrymore
Alice Adams, starring Katharine Hepburn
Amphitryon (Germany)
Anna Karenina, starring Greta Garbo and Fredric March
Annie Oakley, starring Barbara Stanwyck
The Arizonian, starring Richard Dix

B
La Bandera, directed by Julien Duvivier and starring Jean Gabin (France)
Barbary Coast, starring Miriam Hopkins, Edward G. Robinson and Joel McCrea
Becky Sharp, starring Miriam Hopkins (first feature made in Three Strip Technicolor)
Black Fury, directed by Michael Curtiz, starring Paul Muni
The Black Room, starring Boris Karloff
Bordertown, starring Paul Muni and Bette Davis
Boys Will Be Boys, starring Will Hay (GB)
Brewster's Millions, starring Jack Buchanan and Lili Damita (GB)
The Bride Comes Home, starring Claudette Colbert and Fred MacMurray
Bride of Frankenstein, directed by James Whale, starring Boris Karloff and Elsa Lanchester
Broadway Melody of 1936, starring Jack Benny, Eleanor Powell, Robert Taylor

C
The Call of the Wild, starring Clark Gable
Captain Blood, starring Errol Flynn and Olivia de Havilland
Car of Dreams, starring John Mills (Britain)
Carnival in Flanders (La Kermesse héroïque), directed by Jacques Feyder (France)
Charlie Chan in Egypt, starring Warner Oland
China Seas, starring Clark Gable, Jean Harlow and Wallace Beery
Coal Face, a documentary directed by Alberto Cavalcanti (GB)
Crime and Punishment, directed by Josef von Sternberg, starring Peter Lorre
The Crime of Dr. Crespi, starring Erich Von Stroheim
The Crusades, directed by Cecil B. DeMille, starring Henry Wilcoxon and Loretta Young
Curly Top, starring Shirley Temple

D
Dandy Dick, starring Will Hay (GB)
Dangerous, starring Bette Davis and Franchot Tone
Dante's Inferno, starring Spencer Tracy and Claire Trevor
The Dark Angel, starring Fredric March and Merle Oberon
David Copperfield, directed by George Cukor, starring Edna May Oliver, Freddie Bartholomew, W. C. Fields
Death Drives Through, directed by Edward L. Cahn
Devdas (India)
The Devil Is a Woman, directed by Josef von Sternberg, starring Marlene Dietrich
Dinky, starring Jackie Cooper and Mary Astor
Doubting Thomas , starring Will Rogers
Drake of England, starring Matheson Lang and Jane Baxter (GB)

E-F
Escapade, starring William Powell
Escape Me Never, directed by Paul Czinner, starring Elisabeth Bergner (GB)
Every Night at Eight, starring George Raft and Alice Faye
The Farmer Takes a Wife, directed by Victor Fleming, starring Janet Gaynor and Henry Fonda
Foreign Affaires, directed by and starring Tom Walls (Britain)
Four Hours to Kill!, starring Richard Barthelmess
Frisco Kid, starring James Cagney
Front Page Woman, directed by Michael Curtiz, starring Bette Davis and George Brent

G
G Men, starring James Cagney and Ann Dvorak
The Ghost Goes West, directed by René Clair, starring Robert Donat, Jean Parker, Eugene Pallette (GB)
The Gilded Lily, starring Claudette Colbert and Fred MacMurray
The Girl from 10th Avenue, starring Bette Davis
The Glass Key, starring George Raft
Go Into Your Dance, starring Al Jolson and Ruby Keeler
Goin' to Town, starring Mae West
Gold Diggers of 1935, a Busby Berkeley musical starring Dick Powell and Gloria Stuart
The Good Fairy, starring Margaret Sullavan and Herbert Marshall
 The Great Impersonation, directed by Alan Crosland, starring Edmund Lowe and Valerie Hobson

H
Hands Across the Table, starring Carole Lombard and Fred MacMurray
Harmony Lane, starring Douglass Montgomery
Home on the Range, starring Jackie Coogan and Randolph Scott
Hop-Along Cassidy, starring William Boyd
Hyde Park Corner, directed by Sinclair Hill, starring Gordon Harker (Britain)

I-J
I Live My Life, starring Joan Crawford and Frank Morgan
In Old Kentucky, starring Will Rogers
The Informer, directed by John Ford, starring Victor McLaglen
An Inn in Tokyo (Tokyo no yado), directed by Yasujirō Ozu (Japan)
Jánošík, directed by Martin Frič (Czechoslovakia)
Jedenácté přikázání (The Eleventh Commandment) (Czechoslovakia)

L
The Last Days of Pompeii, starring Preston Foster and Basil Rathbone
Life Begins at 40, starring Will Rogers
Little Big Shot, directed by Michael Curtiz
The Little Colonel, starring Shirley Temple and Lionel Barrymore
Little Mother (Kleine Mutti) (Austria/Hungary)
The Littlest Rebel, starring Shirley Temple
The Lives of a Bengal Lancer, starring Gary Cooper and Franchot Tone
Long Live with Dearly Departed (Ať žije nebožtík) (Czechoslovakia)
Lucrezia Borgia, directed by Abel Gance, starring Edwige Feuillère (France)

M
Mad Love (aka The Hands of Orlac), starring Peter Lorre
Magnificent Obsession, starring Irene Dunne and Robert Taylor
The Making of a King (Der alte und der junge König), starring Emil Jannings (Germany)
Man of the Moment, starring Douglas Fairbanks, Jr. (GB)
Man on the Flying Trapeze, starring W. C. Fields
The Man Who Broke the Bank at Monte Carlo, starring Ronald Colman and Joan Bennett
Men of Action, starring Frankie Darro and Barbara Worth
Midshipman Easy, directed by Carol Reed, starring Hughie Green and Margaret Lockwood (GB)
A Midsummer Night's Dream, directed by Max Reinhardt and William Dieterle
The Million Ryo Pot (Tange Sazen Yowa: Hyakuman Ryō no Tsubo) (Japan)
Les Misérables, starring Fredric March and Charles Laughton
Mississippi, starring Bing Crosby, W. C. Fields and Joan Bennett
Moscow Nights, directed by Anthony Asquith, starring Laurence Olivier (GB)
The Murder Man, starring Spencer Tracy
Music Hath Charms, directed by Thomas Bentley, starring Henry Hall (Britain)
Mutiny on the Bounty, starring Clark Gable and Charles Laughton
The Mystery of Edwin Drood, starring Claude Rains and Valerie Hobson

N
Naughty Marietta, starring Jeanette MacDonald and Nelson Eddy
The New Gulliver, directed by Aleksandr Ptushko, a stop motion-animated film (U.S.S.R.)
New Women (Xīn nǚxìng) (China)
A Night at the Opera, directed by Sam Wood, starring the Marx Brothers, Kitty Carlisle, Allan Jones
The Night Is Young, starring Ramon Navarro
No Limit, starring George Formby (GB)
No More Ladies, starring Joan Crawford and Robert Montgomery

O-P
Our Little Girl, starring Shirley Temple
Page Miss Glory, starring Marion Davies, Pat O'Brien, Dick Powell, Mary Astor, and Patsy Kelly
Party Wire, starring Jean Arthur and Victor Jory
The Passing of the Third Floor Back, starring Conrad Veidt (GB)
Peter Ibbetson, directed by Henry Hathaway, starring Gary Cooper and Ann Harding
Police Chief Antek (Antek policmajster) (Poland)
Princess Tam Tam, starring Josephine Baker (France)
Private Worlds, starring Claudette Colbert, Charles Boyer, Joel McCrea
Professional Soldier, starring Victor McLaglen
Public Hero No. 1, starring Lionel Barrymore and Jean Arthur

R
The Raven, starring Boris Karloff and Béla Lugosi
Reckless, a musical starring Jean Harlow, William Powell, Franchot Tone
Red Passport, directed by Guido Brignone, starring Isa Miranda (Italy)
Remember Last Night?, directed by James Whale, starring Edward Arnold and Constance Cummings
Rendezvous (1935), starring William Powell
Roberta, a musical starring Irene Dunne, Fred Astaire, Ginger Rogers,  Randolph Scott, with an uncredited appearance by  Lucille Ball
Royal Cavalcade, a historical film celebrating George V's silver jubilee with six directors and a large ensemble cast (GB)
Ruggles of Red Gap, directed by Leo McCarey, starring Charles Laughton

S
The Scoundrel, starring Noël Coward
Scrooge (GB)
She, starring Randolph Scott
She Couldn't Take It, starring George Raft and Joan Bennett
She Married Her Boss, starring Claudette Colbert and Melvyn Douglas
Sheela (Indian)
Shanghai, starring Charles Boyer and Loretta Young 
The Silent Code, starring Kane Richmond and Blanche Mehaffey
So Red the Rose, starring Margaret Sullavan
Sons and Daughters in a Time of Storm (Fengyun ernu) (China)
The Soul of the Accordion (El alma de bandoneón) (Argentina)
Special Agent, starring Bette Davis and George Brent
Splendor, starring Miriam Hopkins and Joel McCrea
Squibs directed by Henry Edwards and starring Betty Balfour (Britain)
Star of Midnight, starring William Powell and Ginger Rogers
Steamboat Round the Bend, starring Will Rogers

T
A Tale of Two Cities, starring Ronald Colman and Elizabeth Allan
Thanks a Million, starring Dick Powell and Ann Dvorak
Toni by Jean Renoir (France) – the most significant precursor to the Italian neorealist movement
Top Hat, starring Fred Astaire and Ginger Rogers
The Triumph of Sherlock Holmes (British), a Sherlock Holmes film directed by Leslie Hiscott based on the Arthur Conan Doyle novel The Valley of Fear, starring Arthur Wontner as Holmes, and Ian Fleming as Watson
Triumph of the Will – Nazi propaganda film directed by Leni Riefenstahl (Germany)
Tumbling Tumbleweeds, western with Gene Autry
Trans-atlantic Tunnel, starring Richard Dix and Leslie Banks (GB)
Turn of the Tide, starring John Garrick and Geraldine Fitzgerald (GB)

V-Y
Villa for Sale (Ez a villa eladó) (Hungary)The Village Squire, starring Vivien Leigh (GB)Waterfront Lady, starring Ann Rutherford, Frank AlbertsonThe Wedding Night, starring Gary Cooper and Anna StenWerewolf of London, starring Henry Hull, Warner Oland, Valerie HobsonWestward Ho, starring John WayneThe Whole Town's Talking, starring Edward G. Robinson and Jean ArthurWay Down East, starring Henry FondaXin nü xing (directed by: Chusheng Cai), starring: Ruan Lingyu, Naidong Wang and Junli Zheng.The Youth of Maxim (Yunost Maksima) (USSR)

SerialsThe Adventures of Rex and Rinty, starring Rex the Wonder Horse and Rin Tin TinThe Call of the Savage, directed by Lew LandersThe Fighting MarinesThe Lost CityThe Miracle Rider, starring Tom MixThe New Adventures of Tarzan, starring Herman BrixThe Phantom Empire, starring Gene AutryQueen of the Jungle, directed by Robert F. HillThe Roaring WestRustlers of Red Dog, directed by Lew LandersTailspin Tommy in the Great Air MysteryComedy film seriesHarold Lloyd (1913–1938)Charlie Chaplin (1914–1940)Lupino Lane (1915–1939)Buster Keaton (1917–1944)Laurel and Hardy (1921–1945)Thicker than WaterOur Gang (1922–1944)Harry Langdon (1924–1936)Wheeler and Woolsey (1929–1937)Marx Brothers (1929–1946)The Three Stooges (1934–1959)

Animated short film seriesKrazy Kat (1925–1940)Oswald the Lucky Rabbit (1927–1938)Mickey Mouse (1928–1953)Screen Songs (1929–1938)Silly Symphonies (1929–1939)
 The Tortoise and the Hare The Golden Touch The Robber Kitten Water Babies The Cookie Carnival Who Killed Cock Robin? Music Land Three Orphan Kittens Cock o' the Walk Broken ToysLooney Tunes (1930–1969)Terrytoons (1930–1964)Merrie Melodies (1931–1969)Scrappy (1931–1941)Betty Boop (1932–1939)Popeye (1933–1957)ComiColor Cartoons (1933–1936)Happy Harmonies (1934–1938)Cartune Classics (1934–1935)Color Rhapsodies (1934–1949)Rainbow Parades (1935–1936)

Births
January 1 – Brian G. Hutton, American actor and director (died 2014)
January 2 - John Considine (actor), American writer and actor
January 5 - Gerald R. Molen, American producer and actor
January 8 – Elvis Presley, American rock singer and actor (died 1977)
January 9 – Bob Denver, American comic actor (died 2005)
January 22 – Seymour Cassel, American actor (died 2019)
January 28 - Nicholas Pryor, American actor
January 30 – Elsa Martinelli, Italian actress (died 2017)
February 17 - Christina Pickles, British-American actress
February 25 - Sally Jessy Raphael, American former tabloid talk show host
February 26
Stephen Pearlman, American actor (died 1998)
Jane Wagner, American writer, director and producer
March 11 - Nancy Kovack, American retired actress
March 15 - Judd Hirsch, American actor
March 18
Oumarou Ganda, Nigerien director and actor (died 1981)
Leslie Parrish, American actress, writer and producer
March 19 - Burt Metcalfe, Canadian-American actor (died 2022)
March 22 – M. Emmet Walsh, American character actor and comedian
March 24 - Mary Berry, English television presenter
March 27 – Julian Glover, English actor
April 4 – Kenneth Mars, American actor and voice actor (died 2011)
April 5 – Enrique Álvarez Félix, Mexican actor (died 1996)
April 9 - Motomu Kiyokawa, Japanese actor and voice actor (died 2022)
April 10 – Álvaro de Luna, Spanish actor (died 2018)
April 16 - Bobby Vinton, American singer, songwriter and actor
April 19 – Dudley Moore, English-born comic actor and musician (died 2002)
April 20 – Mario Camus, Spanish director (died 2021)
April 21 – Charles Grodin, American actor (died 2021)
April 22 - Mario Machado, Chinese-American actor and broadcaster (died 2013)
April 23 - Franco Citti, Italian actor (died 2016)
April 27 
 Theo Angelopoulos, Greek filmmaker, screenwriter and film producer (died 2012)
 Nikki van der Zyl, German voice-over artist (died 2021)
May 2 – Lance LeGault, American film and television actor (died 2012)
May 11 – Doug McClure, American actor (died 1995)
May 19 - David Hartman (TV personality), American television personality and media host
May 25 - George Roubicek, Austrian actor
May 26 – Sheila Steafel, British actress (died 2019)
May 27 
 Carole Lesley, English actress (died 1974) 
 Lee Meriwether, American beauty queen and actress
May 28 - Anne Reid, English actress
May 30 – Ruta Lee, Canadian-American actress and dancer
June 2 - Roger Brierley, English actor (died 2005)
June 3 - Irma P. Hall, American actress
June 16 – James Bolam, English actor
June 21 - Monte Markham, American actor
June 27 – Ramon Zamora, Filipino martial arts actor (died 2007)
June 29 - Keith Walker (writer), American writer, producer and actor (died 1996)
July 1 – David Prowse, English bodybuilder, weightlifter and character actor (died 2020)
July 5 – Christian Doermer, German actor (died 2022)
July 8 - Steve Lawrence, American singer and actor
July 9 - Michael Williams (actor), British actor (died 2001)
July 13 – Gregorio Casal, Mexican actor (died 2018)
July 15
Gianni Garko, Croatian-born Italian actor
Alex Karras, American football player, professional wrestler and actor (died 2012)
July 17 
Diahann Carroll, African American singer and actress (died 2019)
Donald Sutherland, Canadian-born actor
July 22 - Stanley Ralph Ross, American writer and actor (died 2000)
July 31 - Geoffrey Lewis (actor), American actor (died 2015)
August 2 – Amidou, Moroccan-French actor (died 2013)
August 3 – Omero Antonutti, Italian actor and voice actor (died 2019)
August 5
Michael Ballhaus, German cinematographer (died 2017)
Wanda Ventham, English actress
August 7 – Yoná Magalhães, Brazilian actress (died 2015)
August 8 - Donald P. Bellisario, American television producer and screenwriter
August 12 – John Cazale, American actor (died 1978)
August 15 - Jim Dale, English actor, director and singer
August 16 - Janet Henfrey, British actress
August 23 - Ronald Falk, Australian actor (died 2016)
August 24 - Lando Buzzanca, Italian actor (died 2022)
August 28 - Sonny Shroyer, American actor and singer
August 29 - William Friedkin, American director, producer and screenwriter
August 31 – Rosenda Monteros, Mexican actress (died 2018)
September 2 - Kenneth Tsang, Hong Kong actor (died 2022)
September 9
Nadim Sawalha, Jordanian-British actor
Chaim Topol, Israeli actor, singer, comedian and producer (died 2023)
September 21 - Henry Gibson, American actor, singer and songwriter (died 2009)
September 24 – Sean McCann, Canadian actor (died 2019)
September 28 - Ronald Lacey, English actor (died 1991)
September 29 - Mylène Demongeot, French actress (died 2022)
October 1 – Julie Andrews, English-born singer and actress
October 3  – Armen Dzhigarkhanyan, Soviet Russian-Armenian actor (died 2020)
October 18 – Peter Boyle, American actor (died 2006)
October 20 – Jerry Orbach, American actor and singer (died 2004)
October 24 – Rosamaria Murtinho, Brazilian actress
November 7
Billy "Green" Bush, American actor
Judy Parfitt, English actress
November 8 - Alain Delon, French actor
November 13 - Tom Atkins (actor), American actor
November 21 – Michael Chapman, American cinematographer (died 2020)
November 22 - Michael Callan, American actor (died 2022)
November 24 – Salim Khan, Indian Bollywood screenwriter
November 29
Diane Ladd, American actress
Amanda Walker, English actress
December 1 – Woody Allen, American comedian, director and actor
December 2 - Hy Pyke, American character actor (died 2006)
December 5 – Basabi Nandi, Indian actress (died 2018)
December 8 
 Dharmendra, Indian film actor, producer and politician
 Hans-Jürgen Syberberg, German director
December 10 – Jaromil Jireš, Czechoslovak director (died 2001)
December 14
Lewis Arquette, American actor, writer and producer (died 2001)
Lee Remick, American actress (died 1991)
December 18 - Rosemary Leach, British actress (died 2017)
December 21 - Phil Donahue, American media personality, writer and producer
December 24 - Tommy Dysart, Scottish-born Australian actor (died 2022)
December 28 - William Bassett (actor), American actor
December 30 - Jack Riley (actor), American actor, comedian and writer (died 2016)

Deaths
January 19 – Lloyd Hamilton, American comedy actor (born 1899)
February 7 – Frederick Warde, English Shakespearean actor (born 1851)
March 8 – Ruan Lingyu, Chinese silent film actress, committed suicide (born 1910)
March 23 – Florence Moore, American singer and silent film actress (born 1886)
May 4 – Junior Durkin, American actor, in a road accident (born 1915) 
May 13 – Clarence Geldart, Canadian-American actor (born 1867)
August 14 – Léonce Perret, French actor, director and producer (born 1880)
August 15 – Will Rogers, American humorist and actor (born 1879)
August 25 – Mack Swain, American actor (born 1876)
September 28 – William Kennedy Dickson, British film pioneer, cancer (born 1860)
December 16 – Thelma Todd, American actress, carbon monoxide poisoning (born 1906)

 Film debuts 
Don Ameche – Dante's InfernoPedro Armendáriz – RosarioJoan Davis – Millions in the AirBuddy Ebsen – Broadway Melody of 1936Henry Fonda – The Farmer Takes of WifeJoan Fontaine – No More LadiesJon Hall – Women Must DressOlivia de Havilland – Alibi IkeDanny Kaye – Moon Over ManhattanFrances Langford – Every Night at EightVivien Leigh – Look Up and LaughJames Mason – Late ExtraBurgess Meredith – The ScoundrelRoy Rogers – Slightly Static''

References

 
Film by year